Soldier Girls is a 1981 documentary film by Nick Broomfield and Joan Churchill about several women training in the US army.

Summary
Under the aggressive Sergeant Abing are several young women, some dedicated to defending their country, others who seem to have been forced into joining by circumstance. Several of these recruits become harder and colder through the course of their basic training at Fort Gordon.

Accolades
BAFTA Award for Best Documentary

In popular culture
Excerpts from the film are used in U2's song "Seconds" on their third album, War.

References

External links 
 
 
 BFI
 Official trailer
 Entire film officially post by Joan Churchill on Vimeo

1981 films
Films directed by Nick Broomfield
Documentary films about war
Documentary films about women
Women in the United States Army
American documentary films
British documentary films
1981 documentary films
1980s English-language films
1980s American films
1980s British films